A driver's reminder appliance (DRA) is a manual switch in the driving cab of a passenger train. When operated it glows bright red and prevents the driver from being able to apply power. It was introduced in the design and operation of United Kingdom passenger trains in the 1990s in response to a series of railway accidents where train drivers had passed a signal at danger when starting away from a station.

Operation 
Use of the DRA is mandatory for drivers of British passenger trains and they are required by the Drivers' Rule Book to set it:
 When closing down, entering or leaving the cab
 When the train is stopped at a red signal
 When the train is stopped after passing a signal displaying a single yellow (caution) aspect

The DRA must only be reset:
 When the driver has authority to start the train
 When the signal has cleared to a proceed aspect or in the case of stopping when a cautionary aspect had been passed can be reset to proceed towards the next signal but serves as a reminder that the driver may be approaching a stop signal.
 When the driver has authority to pass that signal at danger.

Advantages 

A passenger train driver can easily become distracted by station duties and forget that the next signal is at danger. This signal might be hidden from view until the train is close to it and there is insufficient braking distance. The DRA helps prevent this problem because resetting the DRA is the last action the driver will take before powering away from the station.

References

External links 
 Railway Group Standards - 1997
 Halcrow report on SPADs and DRAs

Railway safety